Albert B. Poston (1855 - 1902) was a teacher, principal, preacher, and state legislator in Mississippi. He represented Panola County, Mississippi in the Mississippi House of Representatives in 1882 and 1883.

In 1896 he received voted to be a presidential elector.

He married and had children. He lived in Courtland, Mississippi and Kosciusko, Mississippi.

See also
 African-American officeholders during and following the Reconstruction era

References

African-American state legislators in Mississippi
Members of the Mississippi House of Representatives
1855 births
1902 deaths
African-American schoolteachers
American school principals
Schoolteachers from Mississippi
19th-century American educators
19th-century African-American politicians
19th-century American politicians
African-American Christian clergy
Religious leaders from Mississippi
People from Panola County, Mississippi
People from Kosciusko, Mississippi
19th-century clergy